Garfield: The Movie (identified on screen as Garfield) is a 2004 American comedy film. It is a live-action adaptation to Jim Davis' comic strip of the same name. Directed by Peter Hewitt, it stars Breckin Meyer as Jon Arbuckle, Jennifer Love Hewitt as Dr. Liz Wilson and features Bill Murray as the voice of Garfield, who was created with computer-generated imagery. The film was produced by Davis Entertainment Company and 20th Century Fox. It was released in the United States on June 11, 2004. The film received negative reviews from critics and grossed $200 million on a $50 million budget. A sequel, Garfield: A Tail of Two Kitties, was released in 2006. It is the first Garfield film distributed by 20th Century Fox following the acquisition of the license, which would expire in 2009.

Plot
Garfield, an overweight, lethargic and free-spirited orange cat, lives with his owner Jon Arbuckle. Garfield passes his time by tormenting Jon and outwitting his vicious Dobermann neighbor, Luca. Aside from Jon, Garfield maintains an unlikely friendship with a mouse, Louis, by constantly sparing him, and also socializes with his fellow neighborhood cats, Nermal and Arlene.

Jon has begun habitually bringing Garfield to the veterinarian, in order to see vet Dr. Liz Wilson, whom he is in love with. Jon tries to ask Liz out, but due to a misunderstanding, Jon is given custody of a dog named Odie, who is sociable, friendly and hyperactive. Garfield, however, takes an instant dislike to Odie and competes for Jon's attention. Odie is brought to a canine talent show, where Liz is a judge. Garfield gets chased by the other dogs, which prompts Odie to the center of the ring, where he does a successful improvised dance to the Black Eyed Peas' "Hey Mama". A local television host named Happy Chapman, who is also a judge, is impressed with Odie's performance, and offers Jon a television deal for Odie, but Jon declines.

When Garfield returns home, fed up with Odie's presence in his life, he hits a ball, causing a chain reaction that leaves the house in disarray. When Jon discovers this, he forces Garfield to sleep outside for the night. When Odie comes out to comfort Garfield, he gets inside and locks Odie out. Nermal and Arlene witness this as Odie runs away but is then picked up by an elderly woman named Mrs. Baker. Jon and Liz search for Odie while Garfield's friends express their disappointment with him regarding his treatment towards Odie.

Meanwhile, Happy Chapman, revealed to be allergic to cats, is envious of his news reporter brother, Walter, and dreams to perform on "Good Day New York". Chapman and his assistant Wendell find a notice Mrs. Baker created of Odie and, recognizing the lucrative possibilities, claim Odie as Happy's own. When Garfield sees Odie on television and hears Chapman announce he and Odie are going to New York City, Garfield sets out to rescue Odie. Jon discovers Garfield is also missing, so he asks Liz to help search for him and Odie. Garfield gets into the broadcast tower via the air vents and finds Odie locked in a cage, but Chapman enters and secures a shock collar to Odie, which, when activated, releases an electric shock that forces Odie to perform tricks.

Chapman heads for the train station with Garfield in hot pursuit. However, an animal control officer intercepts Garfield, mistaking him as a stray. Meanwhile, Mrs. Baker tells Jon that Chapman took Odie, making him believe Garfield was taken by Chapman as well and then learn Chapman is leaving for the train station. Concurrently, Chapman's abandoned feline star Persnikitty, who dubs himself Sir Roland, along with the other animals, releases Garfield from the pound. Chapman boards a New York-bound train, with Odie in the luggage car. After arriving just to see the train depart, Garfield sneaks into the train system control room and switches the tracks, leading to an impending multiple train wreck. Garfield hits an emergency stop button which halts all the trains just in time, then returns Chapman's train to the station. Garfield frees Odie and they prepare to leave. However, Chapman chases them and eventually corners the duo in a suitcase area. Chapman threatens Odie with the shock collar, but Garfield's friends from the pound, Louis with his entire rat family, led by Sir Roland, attack Chapman and place the collar on his neck.

Shortly after, Garfield and Odie incapacitate Chapman by activating the collar. Jon and Liz arrive and find Chapman, whom Jon punches in the face for kidnapping his pets. Garfield, Odie, Jon, and Liz reunite and return home, while Chapman is arrested for his supposed involvement with the trains, as well as kidnapping Odie. Back home, Garfield regains his friends' respect as they hail him a hero while Liz and Jon form a relationship.

Cast

Live action
 Breckin Meyer as Jon Arbuckle, Garfield and Odie's owner.
 Jennifer Love Hewitt as Dr. Liz Wilson, Garfield's vet, and Jon's love interest.
 Stephen Tobolowsky as Happy Chapman, a local television host, and his brother Walter J. Chapman, a TV news journalist who reports on relevant events.
 Evan Arnold as Wendell, Happy's butler.
 Mark Christopher Lawrence as Christopher Mello, Happy's co-host.
 Eve Brent as Mrs. Baker, an old woman who rescues Odie.
 Juliette Goglia as Little Girl, a girl who tries to adopt Persnikitty from Animal Control.
 Evan Helmuth as Steward
 Joe Bays as Raccoon Lodge Member
 Leyna Nguyen as News Reporter (Abby), Walter's co-worker.
 Joe Ochman as Engineer, a worker at the Telegraph Tower.
 Rufus Gifford as Dog Owner #1

Garfield creator Jim Davis appeared as an uncredited drunken convention attendee, but his role was cut from the final version of the film.

Voice cast
 Bill Murray as Garfield, Jon's overweight, cynical, lazy and laid-back orange cat.
 Alan Cumming as Persnikitty (his real name is revealed to be "Sir Roland"), an irascible cat.
 Nick Cannon as Louis, a quick-witted mouse.
 David Eigenberg as Nermal, Garfield's naïve best friend.
 Brad Garrett as Luca, an aggressive Doberman Pinscher who guards the house next door to Garfield.
 Jimmy Kimmel as Spanky (unnamed in the film)
 Debra Messing as Arlene, Garfield's love interest.
 Richard Kind as Dad Rat
 Debra Jo Rupp as Mom Rat
 Wyatt Smith, Jordan Kaiser and Alyson Stoner as unnamed kid rats – Kid Rat No. 1, Kid Rat No. 2 and Kid Rat No. 3 respectively

Production
Jim Carrey was considered for the role of Jon Arbuckle. Jennifer Garner and Angelina Jolie were considered for the role of Liz, but both dropped out with busy schedules. Brad Dourif, Thomas Lennon, and Michael Ironside were considered to play Happy Chapman. Ironside was cast, but he dropped out after one day for unknown reasons, and Lennon was busy on Reno 911. Jack Nicholson was considered for the role of Garfield; he was the only candidate besides Bill Murray. According to Murray's Reddit AMA, he was interested in voicing the titular character because he mistook the screenplay writer's name, Joel Cohen, for Joel Coen of the Coen brothers. He accepted the role, briefly skimming through the script. Co-writer Alec Sokolow disputed Murray's claim in 2014: "He knew it was not Joel Coen well before he met Joel Cohen. It's a funny take. And it kind of defends him against the criticism of making such an overtly commercial film. But, it's complete horse shit."

According to Jim Davis, Murray recorded his dialogue in his apartment in New York City and on the set of The Life Aquatic with Steve Zissou in Greece.

Principal photography began on March 10 and wrapped on June 12, 2003.

Release

Garfield: The Movie was released in theaters on June 11, 2004, one week before Garfield's 26th anniversary. During its theatrical run, it was preceded by an Ice Age short film, Gone Nutty. 20th Century Fox Home Entertainment released the film on VHS and DVD on October 19, 2004. The special features includes a behind-the-scenes footage, deleted scenes, and the Baha Men music video "Holla!". The film was released on a 3-disc Blu-ray on October 11, 2011.

Reception

Box office
The film opened up with $21.7 million in the US in its first weekend. It grossed a total of $75.4 million in the US and a further $125.4 million internationally for a total of $203.7 million worldwide.

Critical response
On Rotten Tomatoes the film has an approval rating of 14% based on 138 reviews and an average rating of 3.52/10. The site's critical consensus reads, "When the novelty of the CGI Garfield wears off, what's left is a simplistic kiddie movie." On Metacritic, the film has a score of 27 out of 100 based on 31 critics, indicating "generally unfavorable reviews". Audiences polled by CinemaScore gave the film an average grade of "B+" on an A+ to F scale.

Roger Ebert rated it three out of four stars, saying the film was "charming". Joe Leydon of Variety wrote, "Only very small children still easily impressed by interaction of human actors and CGI quadrupeds will be amused by Garfield." A. O. Scott of The New York Times wrote, "That Garfield speaks in the supercilious, world-weary drawl of Bill Murray is some small consolation, as are a few of the animal tricks."

Murray's response
Murray said in an interview with GQ that he was confused when he agreed to play the voice of Garfield for the film.

Murray continued:

Murray reprised his role two years later in Garfield: A Tail of Two Kitties, also written by the same Joel Cohen.

In the 2009 zombie comedy film Zombieland, when Bill Murray (playing himself) is accidentally shot by Columbus (Jesse Eisenberg), he expresses regret for the film.

Other media

Sequel

A sequel, titled Garfield: A Tail of Two Kitties, was released on June 16, 2006, in North America.

Animated film

20th Century Fox allowed their license with Paws, Inc. to expire in 2009. On May 24, 2016, it was announced that Alcon Entertainment would develop a new CG animated Garfield film with John Cohen and Steven P. Wegner ready to produce and to be directed by Mark Dindal, director of Cats Don't Dance, The Emperor's New Groove and Chicken Little. In August 2019, Viacom (which later merged with CBS to become ViacomCBS (now Paramount Global)) acquired the rights to Garfield, leaving the status of the movie for the time uncertain. In a December, 2020 interview with The Walt Disney Family Museum, Dindal confirmed that the film was still in production. On November 1, 2021, it was announced that Chris Pratt would voice Garfield in the upcoming animated film. On May 24, 2022, Samuel L. Jackson was added to the cast of the film. On August 3, 2022, it was announced that the film will be released on February 16, 2024, but was later delayed to May 24, 2024.

References

External links

 
 
 
 

2004 films
2004 comedy films
2000s adventure comedy films
2000s buddy comedy films
20th Century Fox films
American adventure comedy films
American buddy comedy films
American children's comedy films
American films with live action and animation
Davis Entertainment films
Films scored by Christophe Beck
Films about animals
Films about pets
Films based on comic strips
Live-action films based on animated series
Films directed by Peter Hewitt
Films set on trains
Films set in Los Angeles
Films shot in Los Angeles
Garfield films
Garfield (film series)
Live-action films based on comics
Films with screenplays by Joel Cohen
Films with screenplays by Alec Sokolow
Films about dogs
Films about cats
Films about missing people
2000s English-language films
2000s American films